Waldemar Mühlbächer (25 September 1937 – 3 July 2021) was a German footballer.

Club career 
Mühlbächer joined SC Dynamo Berlin in mid-1956, coming from his first Oberliga and Liga club BSG Fortschritt Meerane. Together with Werner Heine and Martin Skaba, he was one of the players that would later come to shape the team of SC Dynamo Berlin and who did not belong to the generation of players relocated from SG Dynamo Dresden. Mülbächer won the 1959 FDGB-Pokal with SC Dynamo Berlin. He was the top goal scorer of BFC Dynamo in the 1966-67 DDR-Oberliga. Mühlbächer ended his football career with BFC Dynamo after the 1967-68 season. He played 218 matches and scored 31 in total in the DDR-Oberliga as a midfielder for SC Dynamo Berlin and BFC Dynamo.

International career 
Mühlbächer also played in 17 matches for the East Germany national football team from 1958 to 1965.

Notes

References

External links
 
 
 
 

1937 births
2021 deaths
East German footballers
East Germany international footballers
Berliner FC Dynamo players
Place of birth missing
Association football midfielders
Transylvanian Saxon people
People from Mediaș